Fritz Thiedemann (3 March 1918 – 8 January 2000) was a German equestrian, considered to be one of the greatest show jumpers of his time.

Biography
Thiedemann was born as the son of a farmer. His riding talents became clear at a young age, but he could not display them internationally until after World War II. During the war, Theidemann commanded a cavalry unit and was captured and interred at a Russian prison camp by war's end.

At the 1952 Olympics in Helsinki, Thiedemann won medals in two equestrian disciplines, a feat since unequalled. He placed third in the dressage team event, and won another bronze medal in the individual jumping contest with his favourite horse Meteor, with which he would win all major prizes in his career.

The following year, Thiedemann won a jumping silver at the World Championships in Paris. Winning another medal (bronze) in that event in 1956 in Aachen. That same year, he won a gold medal with the United Team of Germany in the 1956 Olympics in Stockholm, while just missing out on an individual medal with a fourth position.

At the 1958 European Championships in Aachen, he took the title. Thiedemann was the flag-bearer of the United Team of Germany (composed of both East and West German athletes) at the 1960 Olympics in Rome. The United Team of Germany successfully defended their jumping title, Thiedemann winning his fourth Olympic medal. In addition, he placed 6th in the individual jumping competition.

Thiedemann died in his birthplace Heide aged 81. The Thiedemann rein is named after him.

References

1918 births
2000 deaths
People from Heide
Sportspeople from Schleswig-Holstein
German show jumping riders
German dressage riders
Olympic equestrians of West Germany
Olympic equestrians of the United Team of Germany
Equestrians at the 1952 Summer Olympics
German male equestrians
Equestrians at the 1956 Summer Olympics
Equestrians at the 1960 Summer Olympics
Olympic gold medalists for the United Team of Germany
Olympic bronze medalists for West Germany
German prisoners of war in World War II held by the Soviet Union
Olympic medalists in equestrian
Recipients of the Silver Laurel Leaf
Commanders Crosses of the Order of Merit of the Federal Republic of Germany
People from the Province of Schleswig-Holstein
Medalists at the 1960 Summer Olympics
Medalists at the 1956 Summer Olympics
Medalists at the 1952 Summer Olympics
German Army officers of World War II